The 2003 West Oxfordshire District Council election took place on 1 May 2003 to elect members of West Oxfordshire District Council in Oxfordshire, England. One third of the council was up for election and the Conservative Party stayed in overall control of the council.

After the election, the composition of the council was:
Conservative 29
Liberal Democrats 12
Independent 6
Labour 2

Background
Before the election the Conservatives controlled the council with 32 councillors, while the Liberal Democrats had 10 seats, Independents had 5 seats and the Labour Party had 2 seats. 16 seats were contested in 2003, with 13 of the sitting councillors defending their seats.

A total of 53 candidates stood for election, 15 Liberal Democrats, 14 Conservatives, 9 Greens, 8 Labour, 6 independents and 1 UK Independence Party.

Election result
The Conservatives retained control of West Oxfordshire District Council with a reduced majority of nine seats. They won 9 of the 16 seats contested, but lost three seats, two to the Liberal Democrats and one to an Independent candidate. This left the Conservatives with 29 councillors, while the Liberal Democrat gains moved them to 12 seats on the council. In total 11 of the 13 sitting councillors who stood again in 2003 won re-election.

The Independent gain from the Conservatives came in Witney Central, where first time candidate Harriet Ryley was elected after campaigning against the redevelopment of the Marriotts Close area for either a superstore or housing. Meanwhile, Labour kept two seats on the council, after Eve Coles held a seat in Chipping Norton ward for the party, while none of the Green Party candidates were elected. Overall turnout at the election was 32.89%.

Ward results

References

2003 English local elections
2003
2000s in Oxfordshire